Clement Sulivane (1838–1920) was an American Confederate soldier, lawyer, journalist and politician. He served in the Maryland Senate from 1878 to 1880.

Early life
Clement Sulivane was born on August 20, 1838 in Port Gibson, Mississippi. His father was Vans Murray Sulivane and his mother, Octavia Van Dorn. His maternal grandfather was Peter Aaron Van Dorn (1773–1837). One of his uncles was Earl Van Dorn. Another uncle was William Vans Murray.

He was educated at a preparatory school in Northampton, Massachusetts. He attended Princeton University in Princeton, New Jersey and graduated from the University of Virginia in Charlottesville, Virginia in 1857. He studied the Law, and was admitted to the bar in 1860.

During the American Civil War of 1861–1865, he served in the Confederate States Army as an aide-de-camp to his uncle, Earl Van Dorn. He later wrote The Fall of Richmond.

Career
Sulivane worked as a lawyer and journalist in Cambridge, Maryland. He then served in the Maryland Senate from 1878 to 1880.

Personal life
Sulivane married Delia Bayly Hayward, the daughter of William Richard Hayward and Eliza Ennalls Eccleston. They had three children:
Earl Van Dorn Sulivane (1869–1950).
Vans Murray Sulivane (1873–1938).
Ruth Sulivane (1874–1953).

Death
Sulivane died on November 9, 1920 in Cambridge, Maryland.

References

1838 births
1920 deaths
People from Port Gibson, Mississippi
People from Cambridge, Maryland
University of Virginia alumni
Confederate States Army officers
Maryland lawyers
American male journalists
Maryland state senators
People of Mississippi in the American Civil War
Journalists from Mississippi
19th-century American politicians
19th-century American lawyers
19th-century American journalists
19th-century American male writers